Boma Airport  is an airport serving the Congo River port city of Boma in the Kongo Central Province of the Democratic Republic of the Congo. The runway is within the southeastern part of the city, just north of the river.

The Boma non-directional beacon (Ident: BOM) is located on the field.

See also

 Transport in the Democratic Republic of the Congo
 List of airports in the Democratic Republic of the Congo

References

External links
 OurAirports - Boma Airport
 FallingRain - Boma Airport
 
 OpenStreetMap - Boma Airport
 

Airports in Kongo Central Province
Boma, Democratic Republic of the Congo